The Sultan Kudarat Islamic Academy Foundation College (abbreviated SKIAFC or simply SKIA) is a non-sectarian private four-year college located in Sultan Kudarat, Maguindanao. The college's 22-acre (8.8 hectares) site is situated across the Rio Grande de Mindanao.

History 
SKIA College was conceived by lawyer Michael O. Mastura, engineer Darwish Al-Gobaishi, and religious leader Salah Muhammad Ali Abdula. It was initially developed as a family-administered madrasah, operated and registered under MECS Order No. 24, s. 1985. It was later incorporated on 2 September 1991 as a non-stock educational foundation.

References

External links 
 Official Website

Educational institutions established in 1991
Universities and colleges in the Philippines
1991 establishments in the Philippines